Portiuncula University Hospital is a public hospital located in Ballinasloe, County Galway, Ireland. It is managed by Saolta University Health Care Group.

History
The Franciscan Missionaries of the Divine Motherhood opened a nursing home at "Mount Pleasant" in 1943, and John Dignan, the bishop of the Roman Catholic Diocese of Clonfert, invited them to found a hospital, which opened on 9 April 1945. The nuns named their hospital after Portiuncula in Italy, the place where Franciscanism began.

The hospital changed its name from Portiuncula General Hospital to Portiuncula University Hospital in November 2015.

Services
The hospital provides 195 in-patient beds and 25 day case beds.

Performance
In July 2014 a number of serious hygiene issues were raised during an unscheduled inspection of the hospital by Health Information and Quality Authority (HIQA). These issues concerned the management of blood monitoring equipment at the hospital, and inspectors found blood-stained sticky tape on a window sill beside a patient's bed, as well as failure to dispose of used blood sampling equipment. Inspectors also found the fixtures of the hospital to be in a state of disrepair. The report recommended a "more robust system of managing and maintaining such equipment is put in place to mitigate the risks to patients and staff of acquiring a healthcare association infection".

References

External links
 Official site

1943 establishments in Ireland
Ballinasloe
Hospitals established in 1943
Hospitals in County Galway
Health Service Executive hospitals
Hospital buildings completed in 1943